Sanguisorbeae is a tribe of the rose family, Rosaceae. It contains 16 genera in two subtribes, Agrimoniinae and Sanguisorbinae.

References

External links  

 
Rosoideae
Rosales tribes